Asger Svendsen is a Danish performer and professor of bassoon and chamber music.  He was educated at the Royal Danish Academy of Music (RDAM) as a bassoonist and pianist.

Apart from teaching at the RDAM, he is also professor at the Music Academy in Malmö, Sweden where he is in addition leader of the woodwind education.

Has played in most major Danish orchestras, including being solo bassoonist in the Danish Radio Symphony Orchestra.

References

External links
  official website

Danish classical bassoonists
Academic staff of the Royal Danish Academy of Music
Living people
Year of birth missing (living people)
Place of birth missing (living people)